The Nanjing University of Finance & Economics (NUFE), colloquially abbreviated as Nancai, is a public university located in Nanjing, Jiangsu, China.

As indicated in its name, the university specializes in financial and economic disciplines, but also provides a wide range of degree programs in law, liberal arts, fine arts, science, and engineering. According to the Shanghai Ranking, NUFE ranks 12th among the universities in finance and economics in China.

History 
The university has evolved from a grain school which was subordinated to the Ministry of Grains in 1956 to many iterations of provincial and national grain schools. It was not until 2003, the university became the current Nanjing University of Finance & Economics.

Campuses 

The Nanjing University of Finance & Economics has three campuses. The university was founded in 2000 by the combination of three universities. A variety of majors/disciplines are available for study. Like at other universities in China, English study is compulsory.

References

External links
 Suqian College 6th dept. sponsored by 
 南京财经大学 Official website 
 Nanjing University of Finance & Economics Official website 

1956 establishments in China
Business schools in China
Educational institutions established in 1956
Universities and colleges in Nanjing